Lukas Hutecek (born 2 July 2000) is an Austrian handball player for HC Fivers Margareten and the Austrian national team.

He represented Austria at the 2020 European Men's Handball Championship.

References

2000 births
Living people
Austrian male handball players